KZFR (90.1 FM) is a non-profit, community radio station located in Chico, California. The idea started out as a translator for KPFA in Berkeley in 1981, but when it began transmitting in July 1990 it was locally originated content. KZFR broadcasts local Internet station Radio Paradise from midnight to 6 AM.

KZFR features diverse programming.  Music programs include shows devoted to reggae, rock and roll, folk, Celtic, blues, jazz, country, zydeco and spiritual music.  Informational programs include Democracy Now, The Real Issue, and the Peace and Social Justice Show.  KZFR also occasionally broadcasts concerts live, usually from the Big Room at the Sierra Nevada Brewery. KZFR also has several Americana themed shows. KZFR can also be heard via the internet at www.kzfr.org.

See also
Community Radio
Sacramento Valley
National Federation of Community Broadcasters
List of community radio stations in the United States

External links
KZFR - People Powered Radio

ZFR
Community radio stations in the United States
Public benefit corporations based in California
1990 establishments in California
Radio stations established in 1990